Michael Anthony Munchak (born March 5, 1960) is an American professional football coach and former player in the National Football League (NFL). After playing college football for the Penn State Nittany Lions, Munchak played left guard for the Houston Oilers from 1982 until 1993 and was a nine-time selection to the Pro Bowl. He was inducted into the Pro Football Hall of Fame in 2001.

After his retirement, Munchak continued his association with the Houston franchise by becoming an assistant coach. He joined the staff in 1994 as an offensive assistant and quality control coach and stayed with the franchise after it moved to Tennessee and became known as the Tennessee Titans, eventually becoming its offensive line coach in 1997 and serving in that position for 14 years.

Munchak became the Titans' head coach in 2011 but was fired after the 2013 season, ending his 31-year association with the franchise. He served as offensive line coach for the Pittsburgh Steelers for five years before becoming the offensive line coach for the Broncos.

College career
Munchak was an offensive lineman for Penn State from 1978–1981. During this time he was a starter for the 1979 and 1981 seasons; however, he missed the 1980 season due to a knee injury. During his senior year, he was named a second-team All-American and was subsequently drafted 8th overall by the Houston Oilers.

Playing career
During the 1982 NFL Draft, Munchak was chosen as the Houston Oilers' first round draft pick (8th overall), making him the first offensive lineman drafted that year. In his rookie season, he quickly earned a starting position at the left guard position. He remained in that position for 12 seasons. During that time he garnered nine Pro Bowl nominations, twice first-team All-Pro, seven All-AFC, and six second-team All-Pro selections. In addition, he was selected for the 1980s All-Decade Team. Munchak's 12-year tenure tied for second most seasons played with the Houston Oilers.

Coaching career

Houston / Tennessee Oilers / Titans
In 1994, only one year after retiring as a player, Munchak joined the Houston Oilers staff as an offensive assistant/quality control coach. In 1997 Munchak was named offensive line coach of the newly relocated Tennessee Oilers, a position he held for the next fourteen seasons. Following Jeff Fisher's departure as head coach, Munchak was named head coach of the Titans on February 7, 2011. The 2011 season marked his 30th season with the organization. The 2013 season, Munchak's third as head coach, yielded a record of 7–9. That offseason, franchise CEO Tommy Smith and general manager Ruston Webster requested that Munchak replace at least six assistant coaches. Munchak disagreed with some of these requests and refused to fully enact those changes in his staff. Munchak was consequently relieved of his position on January 4, 2014.

Pittsburgh Steelers

The 2014 season marked the first season since 1982 that Munchak had no involvement (as a player or coach) with the Oilers/Titans franchise. Munchak eventually became the offensive line coach for the Pittsburgh Steelers. In a 2015 NFL playoff game against the Cincinnati Bengals, Munchak yanked Bengals player Reggie Nelson's hair, drawing a 15-yard unsportsmanlike conduct penalty. He was subsequently issued a $10,000 fine by the NFL for the incident that was later rescinded after it was determined that the incident was inadvertent.

Denver Broncos
After being a finalist for the Denver Broncos' head coach position, the Broncos hired Munchak to be their offensive line coach on January 14, 2019. Munchak missed the team's week 8 game in 2020 against the Los Angeles Chargers due to COVID-19 protocols. On February 2, 2022, it was announced that the Broncos would be parting ways with Munchak.

Head coaching record

Honors
Munchak was elected to the Pro Football Hall of Fame in 2001, along with Nick Buoniconti, Marv Levy, Jackie Slater, Lynn Swann, Ron Yary, and Jack Youngblood.

In June 2003, Munchak was inducted into the National Polish American Sports Hall of Fame.

The street in front of Scranton High School is named for Munchak.

The United Way of Lackawanna County, Pennsylvania has a charity golf tournament named after Munchak.  Each year the tournament is held the last week of June at The Country Club of Scranton in Clarks Summit, Pennsylvania.

Personal life

Munchak and his wife, Marci, have two daughters, Alex and Julie.

References

External links

 Pittsburgh Steelers bio
 Tennessee Titans bio
 

1960 births
Living people
American football offensive guards
Houston Oilers coaches
Houston Oilers players
Tennessee Titans coaches
Tennessee Titans head coaches
Pittsburgh Steelers coaches
Denver Broncos coaches
Penn State Nittany Lions football players
American Conference Pro Bowl players
Pro Football Hall of Fame inductees
Sportspeople from Scranton, Pennsylvania
Players of American football from Pennsylvania
American people of Polish descent
National Football League players with retired numbers
Ed Block Courage Award recipients